Scouting and Guiding on Réunion is served by at least three French Scout and Guide associations. There is an overseas branch of the Scouts et Guides de France called the Scouts et Guides de France, territoire de la Réunion as well as groups of the Scouts unitaires de France and of the Association des Guides et Scouts d'Europe.

The Scout Motto is Sois Prêt (Be Prepared) or Toujours Prêt (Always Prepared) in French, depending on the organization.

Sources

See also

Scouting in France

External links
Scouts et Guides de France, territoire de la Réunion

Scouting and Guiding in France
Scouting and Guiding by country
Overseas branches of Scouting and Guiding associations